Fabien Mira (born 25 November 1961) is a French former professional footballer who played as a defender. He is currently the manager of Championnat de France amateur Group A side AS Valence.

Born in Montpellier, Mira started his professional career in the 1980–81 season with Division 3 club Vichy. After making 24 appearances during his debut campaign, he was signed by Division 2 side Fontainebleau in the summer of 1981. Mira played 43 league matches during a two-year spell at Fontainebleau, scoring once. In 1983, he joined Bourg-sous-La Roche and scored six goals in 29 appearances during his first season as the team won promotion to Division 2. He then played 32 matches in the 1984–85 campaign as La Roche were relegated back to Division 3. Mira spent one more season with the club before transferring to FC Valence in 1986.

Mira played for FC Valence for two seasons, scoring once in 29 appearances during each campaign. He joined local rivals USJOA Valence in 1988 and went on to spend five years with the club. In the 1991–92 season, he was part of the team that won promotion to Division 2. In 1992, FC Valence and USJOA Valence merged to form ASOA Valence. Mira spent one season with the new club before retiring from playing in 1993, having made a total of 324 league appearances and scored 23 goals.

In the summer of 2010, Mira was appointed manager of AS Valence and in his first season in charge, he led the team to promotion to the Championnat de France amateur.

References

1961 births
Living people
Footballers from Montpellier
French footballers
Association football defenders
La Roche VF players
ASOA Valence players
Ligue 2 players
French football managers